Oscar Haskell (24 April 1857 – 3 September 1943) was a New Zealand cricketer. He played six first-class matches for Otago between 1877 and 1890.

See also
 List of Otago representative cricketers

References

External links
 

1857 births
1943 deaths
New Zealand cricketers
Otago cricketers
Cricketers from Tasmania